Ferdinando Paer (1 July 1771 – 3 May 1839) was an Italian composer known for his operas. He was of Austrian descent and used the German spelling Pär in application for printing in Venice, and later in France the spelling Paër.

Life and career
He was born in Parma into a family of Austrian descent. He came from a musical family. His grandfather Michael Pär was a regimental band member from Peterwardein (today Petrovaradin, part of Novi Sad). His father Giulio Paer was a trumpeter with the Ducal Bodyguards and also performed at church and court events; his mother was Francesca Cutica. He was named Ferdinando after Duke Ferdinand of Parma by Archduchess Maria Amalia of Austria, Duke Ferdinand's wife. He studied the music theory under the violinist Ghiretti, a pupil of the Conservatorio della Pietà de' Turchini in Naples. His first Italian opera, Circe, was given during the Carnival of Venice in 1792; others rapidly followed, and his name was soon famous throughout Italy. In 1797, he went to Vienna, where his future wife, the singer , had obtained an engagement. There he became music director of the Kärntnertortheater until 1801, where he produced a series of operas, including his Camilla (1799) and his Achille (1801). He enjoyed the patronage of the music-loving Empress Marie Therese, composing several works for her private concerts. In 1802 he was appointed composer to the court theatre at Dresden, the Morettisches Opernhaus, where his wife was also engaged as a singer, and in 1804 the lifetime appointment of Court Kapellmeister was bestowed upon him by Elector Frederick August.

His opera Leonora (1804) is based on the same story as Beethoven's Fidelio, first produced as Leonora the following year. Beethoven had a high opinion of Paer, once jesting that the funeral march in Achille was so fine he "would have to compose it".

In 1807 Napoleon, while in Dresden, took a fancy to him and took him with him to Warsaw and Paris at a salary of 28,000 francs. He composed a bridal march for Napoleon's wedding to Marie Louise, Duchess of Parma (a religious ceremony that took place on 2 April 1810).

In 1809, he composed his most famous opera, Agnese, a dramma semiserio per musica in two acts. Its success spread throughout Europe, and it was performed at the most important theatres (Milan, Naples, Rome, Vienna, London and Paris). It had a deep influence on the following generations of composers and aroused the admiration of many celebrated musicians and musical critics such as Stendhal, Berlioz, Castil-Blaze and Chopin. The primary reason for this success is most certainly the high quality of the music involved, but the dramaturgical structure also presents significant material such as the mad scene involving Agnese's father Uberto (bass).

In 1812, he succeeded Spontini as conductor of the Opéra-Italien in Paris. He retained this post after the Restoration while accepting those of chamber composer to the king and conductor of the private orchestra of the Duke of Orléans. In 1823, he retired from the Opéra-Italien and was succeeded by Rossini. It was around this time that he taught composition to the young Franz Liszt. In 1831, he was elected to the Académie des Beaux-Arts, and in 1832 was appointed conductor of the royal orchestra of King Louis Philippe. In 1824, he was parodied by Daniel Auber in the role of Signor Astucio in Le concert à la cour. He died at 67 in Paris in 1839.

Paer wrote a total of 55 operas, in the Italian Classical styles of Paisiello and Cimarosa. His other works, including several religious compositions, cantatas, many songs and a short list of orchestral chamber pieces.

Works

Oratorio
1803: Il Santo Sepolcro / La Passione di Gesù Cristo

References

Further reading

External links

 
 Website with details on the opera Agnese
 ,  (organ), I Pomeriggi Musicali, Marco Balderi (conductor)

1771 births
1839 deaths
Italian classical composers
Italian male classical composers
Italian opera composers
Italian people of Austrian descent
Male opera composers
Oratorio composers
Musicians from Parma